Thomas F. Cooke (c. 1863–1941) was an American banker and a City Council member in Los Angeles, California, between 1929 and 1931.

Early life and career 
Cooke was born in Center Grove, Iowa, in which state he was a banker and a real-estate broker. In the Spanish–American War of 1898, he earned the rank of captain. He moved to Los Angeles in 1907, and in World War I he served in the Army Quartermaster Corps. He worked for the Pacific Southwest Trust and Savings Bank and for Los Angeles-First National Trust and Savings Bank. In 1927 he completed a trip around the world, on which he carried a "motion-picture outfit" and brought back "many reels of pictures."  He was a member of the Hollywood Board of Trade, the forerunner of the Hollywood Chamber of Commerce. Cooke died May 14, 1941, in his home at 10763 Wilkins Avenue, Westwood, leaving his widow, Nellie Ford Cooke, a son, Edwin; a daughter, Mrs. Elizabeth Argue, and a sister, Mrs. Harrison C. Rice. Cremation was at Hollywood Cemetery.

Public service
In 1924, Cooke was named Los Angeles County representative "to arrange the encampments under auspices of the Military Training Camps Association." He was chairman of the 1928 county grand jury, which indicted District Attorney Asa Keyes, later convicted of bribery and sentenced to prison.

In 1929, he was elected councilman in the 2nd District. He ran for reelection in 1931, when he was living at 1710 North Fairfax Avenue, at the foot of the Hollywood Hills, but lost to James M. Hyde.

References

Los Angeles City Council members
American bankers
1860s births
1941 deaths
American real estate businesspeople
People from Dubuque County, Iowa
American military personnel of the Spanish–American War
United States Army personnel of World War I
Burials at Hollywood Forever Cemetery